Bengt Robert Mathiasson, born 26 February 1979 in Lund, is a Swedish politician who served as chairman of Sweden's Communist Party from 2014 until 2019. He succeeded Anders Carlsson at the 17th party congress in Gothenburg, held in 2014. He has worked as a removal man in Stockholm and as an industrial worker at a Volvo factory in Gothenburg. Mathiasson was previously chairman of Revolutionary Communist Youth between 2002 and 2004.

References
Göteborgs-Posten - Kommunistiska Partiet har fått ny ordförande
Party homepage - ”Vi står starka inför framtiden”
Alingsås Tidning - Mathiasson ny KP-ledare – efterlyser revolution
Expressen - Sven Wollter rörd till tårar under hyllningen
YouTube - Röd Front 2013 med Robert Mathiasson, Kommunistiska Partiet
Värmlands Folkblad - Antirasistiskt möte i Naturum
Folkbladet - Kommunister kämpar för socialistiskt samhälle

1979 births
Living people
Leaders of political parties in Sweden
Swedish communists
People from Lund